Warren Gravette (born 13 September 1968) is an English retired professional footballer who played as a forward and right back in the Football League for Brentford. He went on to have a long career in non-League football.

Career statistics

References

1968 births
English footballers
English Football League players
Association football fullbacks
Brentford F.C. players
Living people
People from Thetford
Association football forwards
Isthmian League players
Tottenham Hotspur F.C. players
Stevenage F.C. players
St Albans City F.C. players
Finchley F.C. players
Hounslow F.C. players
Romford F.C. players
Ware F.C. players
Maidenhead United F.C. players
Harrow Borough F.C. players
Southern Football League players

Collier Row F.C. players